Vermillion County Jail and Sheriff's Residence is a historic combined jail and sheriff's residence located at Newport, Vermillion County, Indiana. The Sheriff's Residence was built in 1868, and is a two-story, Italianate style brick dwelling.  It rests on a raised limestone foundation and has a steep hipped roof.  It features round and segmental arched window openings and a full-width front porch. Attached to it is a two-story, vernacular Romanesque Revival style jail block of rusticated limestone.  The jail block was designed by architect John W. Gaddis and added in 1896.

It was added to the National Register of Historic Places in 1999.

References

Jails on the National Register of Historic Places in Indiana
Italianate architecture in Indiana
Romanesque Revival architecture in Indiana
Government buildings completed in 1896
Buildings and structures in Vermillion County, Indiana
National Register of Historic Places in Vermillion County, Indiana
Jails in Indiana
Houses on the National Register of Historic Places in Indiana